The men's scratch race at the 2022 Commonwealth Games, as part of the cycling programme, took place on 31 July 2022.

Schedule
The schedule was as follows:

All times are British Summer Time (UTC+1)

Results

Qualification
Race distance: 30 laps (7.5km). First 10 riders in each heat qualify to final.
Heat 1

Heat 2

Final
60 laps (15 km) were raced.

References

Cycling at the Commonwealth Games – Men's scratch
Men's scratch race